The McCook Public-Carnegie Library, also known as the McCook Carnegie Library, is a historic building in McCook, Nebraska, United States. It was built as a Carnegie library in 1905, and designed in the Spanish Colonial Revival style by Denver architect Willis Marean. It housed the McCook public library until 1969. Since then, it has housed the Museum of the High Plains. The building has been listed on the National Register of Historic Places since September 12, 1985.

See also

 National Register of Historic Places listings in Red Willow County, Nebraska

References

External links

National Register of Historic Places in Red Willow County, Nebraska
Mission Revival architecture in Nebraska
Buildings and structures completed in 1905
Carnegie libraries in Nebraska
Museums in Red Willow County, Nebraska
1905 establishments in Nebraska